Charles William MacCartney (4 February 1910 – 1982) was an English footballer who played as a centre forward. He scored 45 goals from 85 appearances in the Football League playing for Notts County, Wrexham, Carlisle United, York City and Darlington. He also played non-league football for Stamford Town, Peterborough United and Grantham.

References

1910 births
1982 deaths
People from Stamford, Lincolnshire
English footballers
Association football forwards
Stamford A.F.C. players
Notts County F.C. players
Wrexham A.F.C. players
Carlisle United F.C. players
York City F.C. players
Darlington F.C. players
Peterborough United F.C. players
Grantham Town F.C. players
English Football League players
Midland Football League players